Griffon may refer to:

 Griffin, or griffon, a mythological creature with the body of a lion and head and wings of an eagle

Businesses
 Griffon Aerospace, an American aerospace and defense company 
 Griffon Corporation, a multinational conglomerate holding company
 Griffon Hoverwork, a British hovercraft designer and manufacturer

Species
 Griffon (dog type), a collection of breeds that were originally hunting dogs
 The griffons, several birds of prey in the genus Gyps

Transportation and military
 Bell CH-146 Griffon, a helicopter
 HMS Griffon, the name of several ships of the Royal Navy
 InterPlane Griffon, an ultralight aircraft
 Le Griffon, a 1679 French sailing vessel
 Nord 1500 Griffon a 1950s experimental fighter aircraft      
 Rolls-Royce Griffon, a British aero engine
 , a Canadian Coast Guard vessel 
 , Canadian Forces shore establishment
 VBMR Griffon, a French multi-role armored vehicle

Other uses
 Griffon (framework), an open source rich client platform framework
 Griffon (roller coaster), in Busch Gardens Williamsburg, U.S.
 Griffons (rugby union), a South African rugby union team 
 Missouri Western Griffons, sports teams of Missouri Western State University, U.S.
 Griffon Ramsey (born 1980), an American chainsaw carving artist

See also

 Griffin (disambiguation)
 Gryphon (disambiguation)

ja:グリフォン (曖昧さ回避)